Mount DeVeber (sometimes spelled De Veber) is a mountain in Willmore Wilderness Park in Alberta, Canada.  It is named for former Canadian Senator Leverett George DeVeber.

References

Alberta's Rockies
Two-thousanders of Alberta